Arthur George Clarence Hawthorn (31 October 1859 – 6 May 1934) was a solicitor, and member of both the Queensland Legislative Council and Queensland Legislative Assembly.

Early life
Hawthorn was born in October 1859 at Hobart Town, Tasmania, to George Hawthorn, shipmaster, and his wife Isabella Marie Louise (née Steele). Educated at Hobart High School, he was articled to three separate firms before being admitted as a solicitor in 1884 and immediately received an offer from Brisbane solicitor, Thomas Macdonald-Paterson to join him as a partner in the firm Macdonald-Patterson, Fitzgerald & Hawthorn. The firm was later to become Hawthorn & Byram in 1900, Hawthorn & Lightoller in 1916, and A. G. C. Hawthorn & Co. in 1931.

Political career
Hawthorn was elected to the Ithaca Shire Council in 1899, and rose to be president in 1901. From 1901 until 1904 he was also an executive of the Local Authorities' Association of Queensland.

At the 1902 Queensland elections, Hawthorn, representing the Ministerialists, contested the seat of Enoggera, soundly defeating the sitting Labour member, Matthew Reid. During his time as member, Hawthorn was twice Home Secretary, for eight months in 1907 and for four months in 1908. On 29 October 1908, Hawthorn was appointed Treasurer of Queensland, remaining in the role until his resignation from the Legislative Assembly on 7 February 1911.

Four days after his resignation, Hawthorn was appointed to the Legislative Council, but resigned on 23 March 1912 to unsuccessfully contest the seat of Ithaca at the 1912 Queensland state election where he was defeated by the Labor candidate, John Gilday. Three months later, he was once again appointed to the Council, this time remaining there till it was abolished in March 1922.

Personal life
Hawthorn married Mary Stewart (died 1949) at Glen Lyon on 12 December 1894 and together had two daughters, Alice and Dorothy. He died in May 1934 and his funeral proceeded from Farnborough, his home in Ashgrove to the Toowong Cemetery.

References

Members of the Queensland Legislative Assembly
Members of the Queensland Legislative Council
1859 births
1934 deaths
Politicians from Hobart